Craobh Chiaráin is a Gaelic Athletic Association club in Donnycarney, County Dublin, Ireland. Craobh have won the Dublin Senior Hurling Championship on five occasions, in 1971, 1998, 2001, 2003, 2006. The club was founded in 1962 when two existing clubs, Craobh Rua and Naomh Chiaráin, were amalgamated.

2006
Craobh beat Ballyboden St Endas in the Dublin senior hurling final at Parnell Park by a scoreline of 2–10 to 2-08. They have gone on to qualify for the Leinster championship against Carlow champions Mount Leinster in the preliminary round of the competition.

Achievements
 Dublin Senior Hurling Championship Winners (5) 1971, 1998, 2001, 2003, 2006
 Dublin Senior Hurling League Winners (9) 1972, 1974, 1991, 1994, 1997, 1998, 2001, 2002, 2010
 Dublin Intermediate Hurling Championship: Winners (2) 1965, 1992
 Dublin Junior Hurling Championship: Winners 1964
 Dublin Junior C Hurling Championship Winners 2007
 Dublin Junior D Hurling Championship Winners 2006
 Dublin Under 21 Hurling Championship Winner 1982, 1984
 Dublin Under 21 C Hurling Championship Winner 2018
 Dublin Minor Hurling Championship Winners 1989
 Dublin AFL Division 9 Winner 2006

Famous players
 Alan McCrabbe
 Derek O'Reilly

External links
 
Dublin Club GAA

Gaelic games clubs in Dublin (city)
Hurling clubs in Dublin (city)
Gaelic football clubs in Dublin (city)